Hackman was a cutlery and cookware company founded in Finland in 1790. The Hackman brand is now owned by Iittala Group, which was acquired by Fiskars Corporation in 2007.

In a 2008 survey which included both Finnish and international brands, it was the fifth most respected brand among consumers.

The Hackman butterfly knife (Finnish: Linkkupuukko, "latch-knife") was a type of butterfly knife produced by Hackman.  The knife was marketed by Hackman as a retkiveitsi ("camping knife") and later as Eräpuukko ("wilderness puukko"). The knives were also sold in the United States, and some researchers state they were issued by the U.S. Central Intelligence Agency during the Vietnam War.

References

External links
 http://www.hackman.fi/ (Household kitchen equipment, owned by Iittala)
 https://www.metos.com/manufacturing/ (Professional kitchen equipment, formerly Hackman)

Companies established in 1790
Fiskars
1790 establishments in Sweden
Manufacturing companies of Finland
Companies formerly listed on Nasdaq Helsinki